JFE may refer to:

 JFE Holdings, a Japanese conglomerate
 JFE Just Fiction! Edition, an imprint of the German group VDM Publishing
 Journal of Financial Economics